Frederick Scalera (born May 27, 1958) is an American Democratic Party politician who served in the New Jersey General Assembly from 2003 to 2011, representing the 36th Legislative District. Scalera resides in Nutley, New Jersey and has served as a member of the Board of Education of the Nutley Public Schools.

Biography
Scalera graduated from Nutley High School and Essex County College (Fire Code Technology). Scalera received an Honorary Doctorate in Humanities from Essex County College. He is the Retired Deputy Fire Chief in Nutley.

In the Assembly, Scalera served on the Homeland Security and State Preparedness Committee (as Chair), Housing and Local Government Committee and the Labor Committee. Scalera has served on the Governor's Task Force on Community Emergency Response, Citizen Corps since 2003 and on the Essex County Local Emergency Planning Council since 1991.

Scalera resigned suddenly in January 2011, and was replaced by Essex County Democrats by Kevin J. Ryan, a Nutley native. Later that year, Scalera ran for a three-year term on the Nutley Board of Education and was elected. He was seeking election to the Nutley Board of Commissioners in 2012, which is the town's chief legislative body, but did not receive enough votes to be elected.

In 2014, he received a job with New Jersey Homeland Security out of the Newark office. He left his job with New Jersey Homeland Security in September 2016 for a position in the private sector.

References

External links
Assemblyman Scalera's legislative web page, New Jersey Legislature
New Jersey Legislature financial disclosure forms
2007 2006 2005 2004
New Jersey Voter Information Website 2003

1958 births
Living people
Essex County College alumni
Democratic Party members of the New Jersey General Assembly
Nutley High School alumni
People from Nutley, New Jersey
Politicians from Essex County, New Jersey
School board members in New Jersey
21st-century American politicians